Maguan is a rural town in Zhangjiachuan Hui Autonomous County, Gansu, China. , it has two residential neighborhoods and 15 villages under its administration: 
 Neighborhoods
Caowan
Xinyi

 Villages
Shichuan Village
Xishan Village
Dongzhuang Village
Huanghua Village
Shanghe Village
Badu Village
Xitai Village
Xizhuang Village
Shangdou Village
Xiaozhuang Village
Miaowan Village
Zhaogou Village
Mapu Village
Dongshan Village
Weigou Village

References

Township-level divisions of Gansu
Zhangjiachuan Hui Autonomous County